Below is a complete list of presidential visits made by President of Finland Urho Kekkonen.

List

References

Kekkonen, Urho
Kekkonen, Urho
Presidential trips